Blue John Creek is a stream in Troup County in the U.S. state of Georgia. It is a tributary to Long Cane Creek.

According to tradition, Blue John Creek was so named on account of the blueish hue of its water, "blue john" being a regional term for skim milk.

References

Rivers of Georgia (U.S. state)
Rivers of Troup County, Georgia